Ethmia davisella is a moth in the family Depressariidae. It is found in north-eastern Mexico.

The ground color of the forewings is shining white, with black markings, reflecting metallic blue. The ground color of the hindwings is whitish basally, but pale brownish over the distal one-third to one-half.

References

Moths described in 1973
davisella